The abbreviation UNCP may refer to:

 University of North Carolina at Pembroke, United States
 National University of the Center of Peru, Peru